Efrain Salinas y Velasco (Cuernavaca, 20 January 1886 - 15 December 1968) was a Mexican Anglican/Episcopalian bishop.

He was the Bishop of Mexico in the Episcopal Church from 1934 to 1957. He served as suffragan bishop from 1931 to 1934.

References 

Bishops of the Episcopal Church (United States)
1886 births
1968 deaths
20th-century Anglican bishops in Mexico
20th-century American Episcopalians
Anglican bishops of Mexico
20th-century American clergy